Hymenoptychis is a genus of moths of the family Crambidae.

Species
Hymenoptychis dentilinealis Snellen, 1880
Hymenoptychis phryganidalis Pagenstecher, 1886
Hymenoptychis scalpellalis Pagenstecher, 1886
Hymenoptychis sordida Zeller, 1852

References

External links
 

Spilomelinae
Taxa named by Philipp Christoph Zeller
Crambidae genera